Attenborough is a village in the Borough of Broxtowe in Nottinghamshire, England. It adjoins the suburbs of Toton to the west and Chilwell to the north. The population of the ward, as at the 2011 Census, was 2,328.

The village is home to Attenborough railway station and the Attenborough Nature Reserve.

Features
Attenborough Nature Reserve is a series of gravel pits, which were flooded after gravel extraction and are now a haven for birds and other wildlife.

The main commercial centre of Attenborough is around the junction of Nottingham Road (the A6005) and Attenborough Lane.

Nearer to the nature reserve is a tennis club, along with a private day-nursery, which, in 2005, along with the Attenborough Prep School, was bought by Robert Everist, who then sold the nursery and closed the 100-year-old school. In media coverage, it was claimed that Everist's company had pressured employees into handing in their notice a week before closing the company. The Attenborough Cricket Club (which doubles as the village green) and St. Mary's Church (a Church of England parish church). This southeastern part of Attenborough is bounded to the northwest by the railway line and on the other three sides by the wetlands of the nature reserve. It is the historic part of the village, with two listed buildings and the listed church itself.

In 1944, a plot of land was given on Attenborough Lane by Mr E.V. Brown and Mr J.M. Barnett for a village hall, but it was not until 1955 when funds permitted that construction began. The building was designed by Lionel Thraves of Messrs. Thraves and Son of Nottingham and built by the contractor A.H. Taylor (Nottingham) Ltd. It was named the Lucy Brown Village Hall in memory of the late wife of Mr. E.V. Brown. The cost of construction was £8,200. The opening on 15 September 1956 was attended by Mr. V.H. Oade (vice-chairman of Beeston and Stapleford Council) and Martin Redmayne, Baron Redmayne (M.P. for Rushcliffe).

In 1966 a hoard of Roman coins were found on the footpath that runs over the railway and onto Barrett Lane.

Conservation areas
There are two conservation areas which Broxtowe Borough Council has designated in Attenborough. These are Attenborough Village and Attenborough Barratt Lane.

Attenborough Village Conservation Area
The conservation are comprises Church Lane, the north side of Shady Lane as far as Field House, The Strand and Sportsground and Attenborough Lane to its junction with Allendale Avenue. The conservation area was established in June 1977. Notable buildings include:

Hycroft. 202 Attenborough Lane
Cloud House. 233 Attenborough Lane
St. Mary's Church. Grade I listed 
The Orchards, 1 Church Lane, Attenborough
Blue Gate, Church Lane, Attenborough
Woodbine Cottage, 9 Church Lane, Attenborough
Red Ridges, Church Lane, Attenborough
Thatched Cottage, Church Lane, Attenborough
Croft Cottage. 13 Church Lane, Attenborough
Ireton House. 15 Church Lane, Attenborough Grade II listed 
Rothmere (formerly Glebe Croft). 17 Church Lane, Attenborough
Vale Cottage. 19 Church Lane, Attenborough
Field House Shady Lane
Long Acres, 25 Shady Lane
Rose Cottage, 45 The Strand, Attenborough. Grade II listed 
Brookside. 49 The Strand, Attenborough Architect John Rigby Poyser
The Willows, 51 The Strand, Attenborough. Architect John Rigby Poyser

Attenborough Barratt Lane Conservation Area
The conservation area comprises the major part of Barratt Lane from number 23 to Attenborough Lane, Attenborough Lane from the level crossing to house number 201, and 1, 2 and 3 Long Lane. The conservation area was established in November 1980. The first nine houses were built at the end of the nineteenth century along the south side of Barratt Lane and had their fronts facing the railway rather than the lane, offering fine views towards the church and the River Trent beyond. Notable buildings include:

The Haven, 15 Barratt Lane
16 Barratt Lane. Architect H.H. Brittle 1937
17 Barratt Lane
18 Barratt Lane. Architect John Frederick Dodd 1936
The Firs, 19 Barratt Lane
Attenborough House 21 Barratt Lane.
Norfolk House, 1 Long Lane
2 Long Lane
3 Long Lane

Flood defences
The village was flooded in November 2000. In 2006, plans were drawn up for substantial flood defences for the village. However, the scheme proved controversial because of the impact of a proposed high flood wall along The Strand. After a series of negotiations, planning permission was granted in August 2010, with the defences being moved to behind the village green. The work was completed in summer 2012.

Local government and politics

Attenborough is an unparished area and has no parish council. For local government and electoral purposes, Attenborough is within one of the wards of Broxtowe Borough Council, 'Attenborough & Chilwell East' Ward, and returns one Borough Councillor. In the 2007 local elections, the Conservatives won the seat. For elections to Nottinghamshire County Council the village is covered by the electoral division of Beeston South & Attenborough (consisting of the Beeston Central, Beeston Rylands and Attenborough wards). In 2009, the Conservative candidate won the division.

For elections to Parliament, the village is part of the Broxtowe constituency for which the present Member for Parliament is Darren Henry, for the Conservatives.

History
Attenborough was known in Saxon times as Addensburgh. It was the home village of Henry Ireton (1611 – 26 November 1651), an English general in the army of Parliament during the English Civil War and son-in-law of Oliver Cromwell.

In the graveyard of St Mary's Church, there is a memorial to the 134 people killed on 1 July 1918 in an explosion in the shell factory in nearby Chilwell. This death toll remains the largest number of deaths caused by a single explosion in mainland Britain.

A ferry (Barton Ferry) used to cross the River Trent from the mouth of the River Erewash (near Attenborough) to Barton in Fabis. A crossing existed at this point since before 1774.

Transport
Road transport is the primary method of transport in and out of the area which is connected to Nottingham by the A6005.

Bus
Bus services operate to Nottingham, Derby, Beeston, Stapleford, Long Eaton and other local towns.

Trent Barton
Indigo: Nottingham – QMC – University Boulevard – Beeston – Chilwell – Attenborough – Toton – Long Eaton - Spondon - Derby

Skylink Nottingham: Nottingham - South Lenton - University Boulevard - South Beeston - Chilwell - Attenborough - Long Eaton - Sawley - East Midlands Airport - Loughborough/Coalville

Rail

Attenborough

An hourly service is provided throughout the day by East Midlands Railway Matlock to Nottingham service. Additional services run at peak times, including some operated by CrossCountry.

Beeston
It provides regular and direct connections to various locations across the United Kingdom.

Sport

Notable residents
Henry Ireton Roundhead General during the English Civil War, and son-in-law to Oliver Cromwell, born in Attenborough in 1611.
Sophia Di Martino actress in TV series including Flowers, Friday Night Dinner and Casualty, born in Attenborough in 1983.

See also
Listed buildings in Attenborough and Chilwell

References

Villages in Nottinghamshire
Places in the Borough of Broxtowe